Farès Hamiti (born June 26, 1987, in Blida) is an Algerian football player who is currently playing as a forward for NC Magra in the Algerian Ligue Professionnelle 2.

Club career
On June 27, 2012, Hamiti signed a two-year contract with CR Belouizdad, joining them on a free transfer from USM Alger.

Honours
 Won the Algerian Cup once with JS Kabylie in 2011
 Top scorer of the 2011 Algerian Cup with 6 goals

References

External links

1987 births
Living people
People from Blida
Algerian footballers
JS Kabylie players
USM Blida players
USM Alger players
Algerian Ligue Professionnelle 1 players
CR Belouizdad players
MC El Eulma players
Association football forwards
21st-century Algerian people